The 2001 Atlantic 10 men's basketball tournament was played from March 7 to March 10, 2001, at the Spectrum in Philadelphia, Pennsylvania. The winner was named champion of the Atlantic 10 Conference and received an automatic bid to the 2001 NCAA Men's Division I Basketball Tournament. With eleven teams in the conference following the departure of Virginia Tech, the top five teams in the conference received a first-round bye in the tournament. Temple University won the tournament for the second year in a row. Saint Joseph's and Xavier also received bids to the NCAA Tournament. In addition, St. Bonaventure and Dayton received bids to the 2001 National Invitation Tournament. Lynn Greer of Temple was named the tournament's Most Outstanding Player.

Bracket

All games played at The Spectrum, Philadelphia, Pennsylvania* - Overtime

References
General

Specific

Atlantic 10 men's basketball tournament
Tournament
Atlantic 10 men's basketball tournament
Atlantic 10 men's basketball tournament